Never Again! is an album by saxophonist James Moody recorded in 1972 and released on the Muse label. It was the first album released on the label.

Reception
Allmusic awarded the album 4½ stars with a review stating, "The "Never Again" title refers to James Moody's pledge to stick to tenor and not play alto anymore. He did not reach that goal 100% in the future but did successfully shift his emphasis to tenor which he plays exclusively on this superior Muse LP... Highly recommended".

Track listing 
All compositions by James Moody except as indicated
 "Never Again" - 4:27   
 "Secret Love" (Sammy Fain, Paul Francis Webster) - 6:33   
 " A Little 3 For L.C." (Mickey Tucker) - 8:40   
 "St. Thomas" (Sonny Rollins) - 6:01   
 "This One's for You" (Tucker) - 5:13   
 "Freedom Jazz Dance" (Eddie Harris) - 8:37

Personnel 
James Moody - tenor saxophone
Mickey Tucker - organ
Roland Wilson - electric bass
Eddie Gladden - drums

References 

James Moody (saxophonist) albums
1972 albums
Muse Records albums
Albums produced by Don Schlitten